is a former Japanese football player. He played for Japan national team.

Club career
Murai was born in Chiba on December 1, 1979. He joined his local club JEF United Ichihara (later JEF United Chiba) from youth team in 1998. He became a regular player as left midfielder from 2001. The club won the 3rd place 2001 and 2003 J1 League. He moved to Júbilo Iwata with team mate Takayuki Chano in 2005. He played many matches until 2009 except when he injured in 2006. He left the club with Chano end of 2009 season for generational change and he returned to JEF United Chiba with Chano in 2010. He moved to Oita Trinita in 2012 and played until 2013.

National team career
In July 2005, Murai was selected Japan national team for 2005 East Asian Football Championship. At this tournament, on August 3, he debuted against China. He played 5 games for Japan until 2006.

Club statistics

National team statistics

Appearances in major competitions

References

External links
 
 
 Japan National Football Team Database

1979 births
Living people
Association football people from Chiba Prefecture
Japanese footballers
Japan international footballers
J1 League players
J2 League players
JEF United Chiba players
Júbilo Iwata players
Oita Trinita players
Association football midfielders